Balram Shukla (born 19 January 1982) is an academician, poet and author based in New Delhi. He is a self-taught scholar of Sanskrit and Indian literature. He works as a professor of Sanskrit at the University of Delhi. He is a scholar of Sanskrit, Hindi, Urdu, Persian and Prakrit. He writes poetry in both Sanskrit and Persian, and also translates Persian poetry into Sanskrit using the same poetic metres. He has been awarded the Badrayan Vyas Award for Sanskrit in 2013 by the President of India. He has authored eight books.

Life
Shukla hails from Sohrauna Raja village in Maharajganj, Uttar Pradesh. His father is a retired school teacher. His initial education was at Maharajganj. He received a Bachelor of Arts degree from Gorakhpur and Master of Arts degrees in Sanskrit and Persian from University of Delhi. Shukla topped in both subjects and received the C D Deshmukh gold medal. Shukla then received a PhD in Sanskrit grammar from the University of Delhi. Shukla took up research in Persian after completing his research in Sanskrit.

Since 2004, Shukla has taught in various colleges affiliated to the University of Delhi, including Hindu College and Hans Raj College. Currently, he is a professor in University of Delhi's Department of Sanskrit.

From 2020-2022, he was a research fellow at the Indian Institute of Advanced Study (IIAS) Shimla. He worked on the topic, "प्राकृत कविता के चारुत्व के भाषिक प्रयोजक". His project aims to identify and explicate those linguistic peculiarities of Prakrit languages which have been exploited by poets to embellish their poetry and transcend the beauty of prior literature.

From 2023-2026, he will serve as the director of Swami Vivekananda Cultural Centre, Tehran, Iran with diplomatic rank of First Secretary.

Recognition
Shukla is recognized as one of the foremost young scholars of Sanskrit today. He is well known in India and Iran for his knowledge of Sanskrit and Persian, his expertise in Sanskrit grammar, and his poetry in Sanskrit. He often translates Persian poetry into Sanskrit in the same metre as the original.

Shukla has translated 100 Ghazals of Rumi along with several appendices, directly from Persian into Hindi. The book was recently launched in Iran’s Art Bureau in the presence of the author. Literary critics have immensely praised the book for being a pioneering work in Hindi and as a model for translation. From a review in The Hindu : "The book is a model of how translations of poetic works should be presented so that the readers may become familiar not only with the beauty of the poetry but also the richness of the literary traditions of that language, history of translations, meaning of words and basic principles of its grammar."

Shukla's Persian odes have recently been collected in a volume called "Haft Shaair az Fardaa" which contain sample-poems of 7 non-Iranian young Persian poets.

Awards and honours
Shukla has been conferred many honours. Some of these are
2012: Gold medal in Persian Master of Arts course, University of Delhi.
2012: Honoured by Mahmoud Ahmadinejad, the then President of Iran, for contributions to Persian literature.
2013: Maharshi Badrayan Vyas Samman by Pranab Mukherjee, the President of India.
"Pt. Pratap Narayan Mishra Yuva Sahityakara Samman" conferred by Bhaurao Deoras Seva Nyas, Lucknow on 2 October 2017
Shukla has three Sanskrit poetry collections to his credit. One amongst them is "Parivaahah" which has been published by Sahitya Akademi Delhi This book also have been awarded with "Kalidasa Samman" by Uttar Pradesh Sanskrit Sansthan in 2018.
2021: Conferred with the “Mahakavi Kalidasa Sanskrit-Vrati National Award” by Kavikulguru Kalidasa Sanskrit University, Ramtek, Nagapur (Maharashtra).
2022: Conferred with the “Mahakavi Kalidasa Sanskrit-Vrati National Award” by Kavikulguru Kalidasa Sanskrit University, Ramtek, Nagapur (Maharashtra).

Views
Shukla believes that Sanskrit and Persian have around 350 similar words, owing to their common origin. Shukla says that the influence of some Persian poets like Rumi and Hafez Shirazi is seen in the poetry of several Indian languages including Sanskrit, as well as on Persian poets from India like Bedil Dehalvi. Regarding Sanskrit poetry, Shukla believes that even today, Sanskrit poetry is being composed in the same metres and on the same topics as in Vedic times, and that India has poets who can compose poetry like Valmiki and Vyasa even today.

Works

Books
 Balram Shukla (2009). Adhunik Sanskrit Sahitya Sanchayan, a Hindi research work on modern Sanskrit poetry in India. Delhi: Vidyanidhi Publication. .
 Balram Shukla (2011). Isq-o-Atesh, a collection of Persian poems. Tehran, Iran: Midhat Publication. .
 Balram Shukla (2013). Bharatiya evam pashchattya vakyartha siddhanta, a Hindi research work on Indian and Western theories of sentential meaning. New Delhi, India: Pratibha Prakashan. .
 Balram Shukla (2014). Hindi translation of Dawazdeh Band of Muhtasham Kashani. Rampur, India: Rampur Raza Library. .
 Balram Shukla and Paramanand Jha (2015). Laghusandesham, a collection of short Sanskrit poems. .
 Balram Shukla (2016). Parivahah, a collection of Sanskrit poems. . Published by Sahitya Akademi
Shukla, Balram (2017) ‘Kavitāputrikājātiḥ’, (an original Sanskrit poetry collection) New Delhi:  Rashtriya Sanskrit sansthan, 
Shukla, Balram (Trans.)(2018) Nihshabd-Noopur (Collection and Hindi Translation of Rumi’s  100 Ghazals). New Delhi : MGAHV Wardha and Rajkamal. 

Shukla, Balram (Ed.)(2019) Śatāvadhāniracanāsaṃcayanam (Edited 7 beautiful compositions of modern Sanskrit poet Śatāvadhānī Dr. R. Ganesh with elaborate introduction and 600 notes to the same). New Delhi : Sahitya Akademi. 
Shukla, Balram (2020, 1398hq) Zāfrān-o-Sandal (A Collection of Persian Ghazals), Tehran: Mo,assase-e-farhangi-e-shāerān-e-Pārsīzabān 
Shukla, Balram [ed.] (2021) Paśyantī (A Collection of poems of 75 contemporary Sanskrit poets), Prayagraj: Raka Prakashan. 
Shukla, Balram [Trans.](2021) Nihshabd-Noopur (Collection and Hindi Translation of Rumi’s  100 Ghazals, First paperback edition, Second Edition - December 2021). New Delhi: Rajkamal Paperbacks.

Example poetry
Shukla's symmetrical (in the same metre) translation into Sanskrit of the opening couplets of Rumi's Masnavi, along with the 1898 English translation by Edward Henry Whinfield:

A Sanskrit verse by Shukla:

References

People from Maharajganj district
1982 births
Indian Sanskrit scholars
Living people